Iolanda Keiko Miashiro Ota (born 28 September 1956), better known as Keiko Ota, is a Brazilian politician. She has spent her political career representing her home state of São Paulo, having served as state representative from 2011 to 2019.

Personal life
Ota's father is Nio Miashiro. She is of second generation Japanese descent. Ota is married to local politician Masataka Ota, and the couple have three children: Ives, Ises, and Vanessa. In 1997, Ives, who was only 8 years old at the time, was kidnapped and murdered by one of Masataka's body guards, leading Ota and her husband to campaign against violent crime in Brazil.

Political career
Ota voted in favor of the impeachment motion of then-president Dilma Rousseff. She would later vote in favor of opening a similar corruption investigation against Rousseff's successor Michel Temer, and voted against the proposed 2017 Brazilian labor reforms.

References

1956 births
Living people
People from São Paulo (state)
Brazilian Democratic Movement politicians
Brazilian Socialist Party politicians
Brazilian politicians of Japanese descent
Brazilian women in politics
Members of the Chamber of Deputies (Brazil) from São Paulo